WPEN may refer to:

WPEN (FM), a radio station (97.5 FM) licensed to Burlington, New Jersey
WKDN (AM), a radio station (950 AM) licensed to Philadelphia, Pennsylvania (formerly WPEN)
WOGL, a radio station (98.1 FM) licensed to Philadelphia, Pennsylvania (formerly WPEN-FM, 1943-1947)
WMGK, a radio station (102.9 FM) licensed to Philadelphia, Pennsylvania (formerly WPEN-FM)
WCAU, a television station (channel 10) licensed to Philadelphia, Pennsylvania (formerly WPEN-TV, 1946-1947)
WPEN-LP, a defunct television station in Hampton, Virginia